Hurlburt or Hurlbert may refer to:

Surname
Autumn Hurlbert (born 1980), American actress
Bob Hurlburt (born 1950), Canadian ice hockey player
G. Gordon Hurlburt (20th century), Canadian politician
John Hurlburt (1898–1968), American football player
Kenneth Earl Hurlburt (born 1928), Canadian politician
Marge Hurlburt (1914–1947), American aviator
Philastus Hurlburt (1809–1883), American evangelical
Richard Hurlburt (born 1950), Canadian politician
William Henry Hurlbert (1827–1895), American journalist

Other
Hurlburt, Indiana, U.S.
Hurlburt Field, U.S. Air Force base in Okaloosa County, Florida
Hurlbut Glacier, Greenland
Hurlburt Hurricane, experimental airplane
Hurlbut Township, Logan County, Illinois, U.S.

See also
Lewis Hurlbert Sr. House, historic home located at Aurora, Dearborn County, Indiana.